Tommy Campbell is a former professional American football player who played defensive back for the Philadelphia Eagles

References

1949 births
American football safeties
Iowa State Cyclones football players
Philadelphia Eagles players
Living people